Nurul Islam Jihadi (1948 – 29 November 2021) was a Bangladeshi Deobandi Islamic scholar, educator and spiritual figure. He was the Secretary General of Hefazat-e-Islam Bangladesh and International Majlis-e Tahaffuz-e-Khatm-e Nobuwat Bangladesh, Chancellor and Shaykh al-Hadith of Al Jamiatul Islamia Makhjanul Uloom. He was also a member of the Majlis-e-Shura of Darul Uloom Hathazari and Befaqul Madarisil Arabia Bangladesh, founder and patron of many mosques and madrasas, including Jamia Khatamunnabiyyin in United Kingdom.

Name and lineage
Jihadi was born in 1948, to a Bengali Muslim family in the village of Dhurung in Fatikchhari, Chittagong District, East Bengal. His father's name was Abdur Rashid.

Life and career
After completing his education, he started his career as a teacher at Kaigram Madrasa in Patiya Upazila. After teaching in Kaigram madrasa for one year, he was called to Babunagar madrasa and became a teacher there. After teaching at Babunagar Madrasa for a few years, he taught at Ashraful Ulum Bara Katara Madrasa in Dhaka till 1982. At this time, after the death of his father, he went to his home and rejoined Babunagar Madrasa. On 10 July 1984, he founded Al Jamiatul Islamia Makhjanul Uloom in Khilgaon, Dhaka district. He was the Chancellor and Shaykh al-Hadith of this seminary. He has been serving as an important member of Majlis-e-Shura of Darul Uloom Hathazari and Befaqul Madarisil Arabia Bangladesh. In 1966, he founded a non-political organization called "Islamic Movement Council" to resist Islamophobes.  He was in the companionship of Siddique Ahmad for a long time. He was the Secretary General of International Majlis-e Tahaffuj-e Khatme Nabuwat Bangladesh, established in 1990 with the aim of accelerating the anti-Ahmadiyya movement and the Khatme Nabuyat movement. On 26 December 2020, he was elected Secretary General of Hefazat-e-Islam Bangladesh following the demise of Nur Hossain Kasemi in December 2020. He remained in this post until his death.

Jihadi died on 29 November 2021.

Publications
His books include: 
Akhlak-e Rasul (Saw.) (Character of the Prophet)
Bright stars
The Qadiani fitna and the position of the Muslim nation
Rules of Qurbani
Gulshan-e Nur
Asmane ilm ki chand darakhsande sitare (Urdu)
Tazkera-e Khatib-e Azam (biography of Siddique Ahmad)
Sheikh Sadi's Advice
Nukushe Zindegi and Pandey Namaye Nasir
Qawmi Madrasa, objective method results etc.

See more
Shah Ahmad Shafi
Junaid Babunagari
Muhibbullah Babunagari
Mahmudul Hasan
Nur Hossain Kasemi
Mamunul Haque
A F M Khalid Hossain

References

External links
 

1948 births
2021 deaths
Bangladeshi Islamic religious leaders
Deobandis
20th-century Muslim scholars of Islam
People from Fatikchhari Upazila
Bangladeshi Sunni Muslim scholars of Islam
Hanafis
21st-century Bangladeshi politicians
21st-century Bangladeshi writers
Darul Uloom Hathazari Alumni
Jamiat Ulema-e-Islam Bangladesh politicians
Bengali Muslim scholars of Islam